In geometry the congruent isoscelizers point is a special point associated with a plane triangle. It is a triangle center and it is listed as X(173) in Clark Kimberling's Encyclopedia of Triangle Centers. This point was introduced to the study of triangle geometry by Peter Yff in 1989.

Definition

An isoscelizer of an angle A in a triangle ABC is a line through points P1 and Q1, where P1 lies on AB and Q1 on AC, such that the triangle AP1Q1 is an isosceles triangle. An isoscelizer of angle A is a line perpendicular to the bisector of angle A. 

Let ABC be any triangle. Let P1Q1, P2Q2,  P3Q3 be the isoscelizers of the angles A, B, C respectively such that they all have the same length. Then, for a unique configuration, the three isoscelizers P1Q1, P2Q2,  P3Q3 are concurrent. The point of concurrence is the congruent isoscelizers point of triangle ABC.

Properties

The trilinear coordinates of the congruent isoscelizers point of triangle ABC are
( cos ( B/2 ) + cos ( C/2 ) - cos (A/2') : cos ( C/2 ) + cos ( A/2 ) - cos (B/2') : cos ( A/2 ) + cos ( B/2 ) - cos (C/2') )
 =  ( tan ( A/2 ) + sec ( A/2 ) : tan ( B/2 ) + sec ( B/2 ) : tan ( C/2 ) + sec ( C/2 ) )
The intouch triangle of the intouch triangle of triangle ABC is perspective to triangle ABC, and the congruent isoscelizers point is the perspector. This fact can be used to locate by geometrical constructions the congruent isoscelizers point of any given triangle ABC.

See also
Yff center of congruence
Equal parallelians point

References

Triangle centers